Geneva Lake is a lake located in Waterford Township, Michigan. It lies west of Highland Rd. (M-59) and north of Elizabeth Lake Rd. 
The 19-acre, 35-foot deep lake connects with Fiddle Lake to the north and Otter Lake to the south.

Geneva Lake was previously named Carp Lake as late as 1908.

References

Lakes of Oakland County, Michigan
Lakes of Michigan
Lakes of Waterford Township, Michigan